Jessica Dahiana Martínez Villagra (born 14 June 1999) is a Paraguayan professional footballer who plays as a forward for Spanish Liga F club Sevilla FC and the Paraguay women's national team.

International career
Martínez represented Paraguay at two South American Under-17 Women's Football Championship editions (2013 and 2016), two FIFA U-17 Women's World Cup editions (2014 and 2016), three South American U-20 Women's Championship editions (2014 , 2015 and 2018) and two FIFA U-20 Women's World Cup editions (2014 and 2018). She has scored five goals in the Copa América Femenina (three in the 2014 edition and two in the 2018 edition).

International goals
Scores and results list Paraguay's goal tally first

Honors and awards

Clubs
Sportivo Limpeño
Copa Libertadores Femenina: 2016

Notes

References

1999 births
Living people
Women's association football forwards
Paraguayan women's footballers
People from Itauguá
Paraguay women's international footballers
Pan American Games competitors for Paraguay
Footballers at the 2019 Pan American Games
Club Olimpia footballers
Santos FC (women) players
Primera División (women) players
Real Madrid Femenino players
Paraguayan expatriate women's footballers
Paraguayan expatriate sportspeople in Brazil
Expatriate women's footballers in Brazil
Paraguayan expatriate sportspeople in Spain
Expatriate women's footballers in Spain